William Pollard may refer to:
 William Pollard (Quaker) (1828–1893), English Quaker writer and minister
 William G. Pollard (1911–1989), American physicist and Episcopal priest
 William L. Pollard, American university president
 William B. Pollard III (born 1947), judge of the United States Court of Military Commission Review. 
 William Pollard (priest), dean of Bangor, 1410